The Munchkin, also known as Sausage Cat is a breed of cat characterized by its very short legs, which are caused by genetic mutation. Compared to many other cat breeds, it is a relatively new breed, documented since 1940s and officially recognized in 1991. The Munchkin is considered to be the original breed of dwarf cat. 

Much controversy erupted over the breed when it was recognized by The International Cat Association (TICA) in 1997 with critics voicing concerns over potential health and mobility issues. Many pedigree cat associations around the world have refused to recognize the Munchkin cat due to the welfare of the breed and severity of the health issues, including the Governing Council of the Cat Fancy (GCCF). 

The name "munchkin" derives from writer L. Frank Baum's diminutive inhabitants of Munchkin Country, originating in the 1900 novel, The Wonderful Wizard of Oz.

History

Breed creation
Short-legged cats have been documented a number of times around the world since the 1940s. A British veterinary report in 1944 noted four generations of short-legged cats which were similar to normal cats except for the length of the legs. This line disappeared during the Second World War but other short-legged cats were spotted in Russia during 1956 and the United States in the 1970s.

In 1983, Sandra Hochenedel, a music teacher in Rayville, Louisiana, found two pregnant cats who had been chased under a truck by a dog. She kept one of the cats and named her Blackberry and half of her kittens were born short-legged. Hochenedel gave a short-legged male kitten from one of Blackberry's litters to a friend, Kay LaFrance of Monroe, Louisiana, and she named the kitten Toulouse. It is from Blackberry and Toulouse's litter that today's Munchkin breed is descended.

Registry history of Munchkin breed 
The Munchkin cat was first introduced to the general public in 1991 via a national network televised cat show held by The International Cat Association (TICA) in Davis Oklahoma. However, the breed would not be officially recognized at that time. Critics predicted that the breed would develop back, hip and leg problems similar to those that plague some Dachshunds. For many years, the Munchkin breed was not accepted in feline competitions due to the controversial breeding. Dr. Solveig Pflueger, a show judge, geneticist, and Chairperson of TICA's Genetics Committee was a strong advocate for the official recognition of the breed. Pflueger was also a breeder of Munchkin cats herself, having been initially sent two cats from Hochenedel. Amidst much controversy, the Munchkin was proposed as a new breed by foundation breeders Laurie Bobskill and Robert Bobskill of Massachusetts and accepted by TICA into its New Breed development program in September 1994. One veteran show judge Katherine Crawford resigned in protest, calling the breed an affront to breeders with ethics. The Munchkin breed achieved TICA Championship status in May 2003.

Currently, the only registries that fully recognize the breed are TICA and the Southern Africa Cat Council.
 There is controversy among breeders of pedigree cats as to what genetic mutations are abnormal and potentially disadvantageous to the cat. Katie Lisnik, director of cat protection and policy at the Humane Society of the United States, has said "Breeding animals for exaggerated physical characteristics, particularly when it compromises overall health, is irresponsible". Several cat registries do not recognize the Munchkin: Fédération Internationale Féline, which refuses to recognize what they consider a breed based on a "genetic disease", achondroplasia. The Governing Council of the Cat Fancy likewise refuses to recognize the breed, considering this breed and others like it to be "unacceptable" because they are based on an "abnormal structure or development". The breed is also not recognized by the Cat Fanciers' Association. The Australian Capital Territory (a territory of Australia) government consider the munchkin breed to be "malformed animals" and the deliberate breeding of them "unacceptable" because of the "genetic health problems associated with such breeding".

Characteristics

TICA Standards describe the Munchkin as "outgoing, intelligent, and responds well to being handled". Some sources state that the shortness of their legs does not interfere with their running and leaping abilities, while others state their ability to jump is limited by their condition.

The Munchkin has similar characteristics to normal domestic cats, due to their frequent use as outcrosses. It is a small to medium-sized cat with a moderate body type and medium-plush coat. The hind legs can be slightly longer than the front which creates a slight rise from the shoulder to the rump. The legs of the Munchkin may be slightly bowed, although excessive bowing is a disqualification in the show ring. Cow-hocked legs are also penalized.

The Munchkin comes in all coat colors and patterns. It also comes in a long-haired variety, which is shown in a separate Munchkin Longhair category. The short-haired variety has a medium-plush coat while the long-haired has a semi-long silky coat. TICA rules for outcrossing allows the use of any domestic cat that does not already belong to a recognized breed. Similarity to other breeds is grounds for disqualification. Non-standard Munchkins are not allowed to be shown.

In 2014, Lilieput, a Munchkin cat from Napa, California, was named the shortest statured living cat in the world by Guinness World Records.

Health
It is not fully known how the mutation impacts the health of the breed. Having only been officially introduced in 1991, the breed is still considered young. There were early speculations that the Munchkin would develop spinal problems commonly seen in short-legged dog breeds; however, in 1995 several breeders had their oldest Munchkins X-rayed and examined for signs of joint or bone problems and found none. 

The genetic mutation causing the short-legged trait in Munchkins is referred to as achondroplasia, the genetic disorder that results in dwarfism and is typically associated with an enlarged head as well as short legs but can also involve symptoms that include undersized jaw, thick-looking joints, curved spine, and a bow-legged or knock knee posture. The condition has sometimes been referred to as hypochondroplasia or pseudoachondroplasia. 

However, there appear to be two conditions with increased incidence in the Munchkin breed: lordosis (excessive curvature of the spine) and pectus excavatum (hollowed chest). Both conditions are commonly seen in humans with pseudoachondroplasia.

Munchkin cats are known to be at a higher risk (than other feline breeds) for severe osteoarthritis because the shorter limbs affect their activity levels and behavior. Diagnosis of osteoarthritis and the assessment of its severity for a cat may require radiography.

Many pedigree cat associations around the world have refused to recognize the Munchkin cat due to the welfare of the breed and severity of the health issues.

Genetics
The munchkin gene is autosomal dominant. Homozygous embryos for the munchkin gene, with two copies of the gene, are not viable and do not develop in the womb. Only kittens that are heterozygous for the munchkin gene, with only one copy, develop into viable short legged munchkin kittens. Because only heterozygous munchkin cats are able to pass on the gene, all litters with at least one standard (short legged) Munchkin parent have the possibility of containing kittens with the phenotypes: short-legged or normal-legged (referred to as non-standard munchkin), with the genotypes of Mm or mm, where M is the trait for short legs and m is the trait for long legs. The mating of two munchkin parents, Mm x Mm, have the chance of producing these offspring: 25% MM- a nonviable kitten,  50% Mm-short-legged, 25% mm- normal. The resulting litter will be 2/3 Mm-short-legged and 1/3 mm-normal.

Punnett squares, in which the M represents the dominant munchkin gene and the m represents the recessive normal gene, may be used to illustrate the chances of a particular mating resulting in a short-legged cat.

Kittens bearing two copies of the munchkin gene (MM) will not develop in the womb.  Kittens bearing one munchkin gene and one normal gene (Mm) will be short-legged munchkins. Kittens bearing two normal genes (mm) will be normal. Mm munchkin kittens will be able to pass on the munchkin gene to their own offspring. Normal mm kittens will not, as they do not have a copy of the munchkin gene.

When two munchkin cats are crossed and small litter sizes occur, this indicates that embryos that are homozygous for the munchkin gene are non-viable.

For each kitten conceived from this mating, there is a 25% chance it will fail to gestate, a 25% chance it will be normal, and a 50% chance it will be short-legged.

For each kitten conceived from this mating, there is a 0% chance it will be homozygous for the munchkin gene, a 50% chance it will be normal non-standard (long legged) Munchkin, and a 50% chance it will be a standard (short legged) munchkin.

Derived breeds
The Munchkin has been crossed with the curly-coated LaPerm to create the Skookum, the hairless Sphynx to create the Minskin and Bambino, another curly-coated Selkirk Rex to create the Lambkin, the Persian breed group (which includes Himalayans and Exotic Shorthair) to create the Napoleon (renamed the Minuet), the curled-eared American Curl to create the Kinkalow, the folded-eared Scottish Fold to create the Scottish Kilts, and also with the Bengal to create the Genetta.

See also
 Dwarf cat
 Selective breeding
 Squitten
 Cat body type genetic mutations
 Scottish Fold, a variety of cat with a gene causing osteochondrodysplasia rather than achondroplasia.
 Welsh Corgi, a dog breed with a similar stature and health issues.

References

Cat breeds
Cat breeds originating in the United States
Cat breeds and types with short legs
Inbred animals